The Smell of Us is a 2014 French drama film directed by Larry Clark, focusing on the lives of several middle-class young people in Paris, skateboarding and having sex for pay. It was screened in the Venice Days section at the 71st Venice International Film Festival, and screened in France in 2015.

Plot

Math, Marie, and JP are teenagers living in Paris. They used to hang out close to the Tokyo Palace, a modern art museum. They spend their time skating, smoking pot, drinking and filming each other the whole day. Developing extreme behaviours towards life, they do not hesitate to prostitute themselves just for fun and they keep taking drugs while having sex.

Cast 
Lukas Ionesco as Math 
 Diane Rouxel as Marie 
 Théo Cholbi as Pacman
 Hugo Behar-Thinières  as JP
 Ben Yaiche Ryan as Guillaume
 Adrien Binh Doan as Minh
 Terin Maxime as Toff
Michael Pitt as a street musician
Larry Clark as a drunk bum

Reception 
The Smell of Us was not widely reviewed, and was mostly received unfavorably, as a voyeuristic, inferior French rehash of Kids, with little story. In a 1-star review, The Guardian's Peter Bradshaw wrote, "This film is joyless, passionless, humourless, incurious about real people's real lives. There is no energy or verve, just the compulsive persistence of the porn addict." Jessica Kiang of IndieWire described it as "a film so horrible it manages to significantly outdo the repulsiveness of its title." Boyd Van Hoeij of The Hollywood Reporter characterized it as an "impressionistic and downright depressing tale of adolescent sexuality." Dillard Clayton of Slant called it "yet another entry in the filmmaker’s growingly tiresome oeuvre". Mark Adams of Screen acknowledged that its "characters are largely bland and one-dimensional", but more positively described the film as "provocative and challenging" and "littered with stylish and beautiful moments"

Bibliography
Stéphane Delorme, "Mort à Paris" in : Les Cahiers du Cinéma, Janvier 2015 n°707

References

External links

2014 films
French coming-of-age drama films
2010s coming-of-age drama films
French LGBT-related films
Films about male prostitution in France
Films directed by Larry Clark
Films about prostitution in Paris
LGBT-related drama films
Gay-related films
2014 drama films
2014 LGBT-related films
2010s French films
2010s French-language films